The Chinese Taipei women's national under-18 volleyball team represents Taiwan in women's under-18 volleyball events, it is controlled and managed by the Chinese Taipei Volleyball Association (CTVA) that is a member of Asian volleyball body Asian Volleyball Confederation (AVC) and the international volleyball body government the Fédération Internationale de Volleyball (FIVB).

Team

Coaching staff

Current squad
The following 18 players were called up for the 2018 Asian Girls' U17 Volleyball Championship in Nakhon Pathom, Thailand.

Competition history

Youth Olympic Games
  2010 – Did not qualify

World Championship
 1989 – Did not qualify
 1991 – Did not qualify
 1993 – Did not qualify
 1995 – Did not qualify
 1997 – Did not qualify
 1999 – 13th 	
 2001 – 7th
 2003 – 9th
 2005 – 9th
 2007 – Did not qualify
 2009 – Did not qualify
 2011 – Did not qualify
 2013 – 11th
 2015 – 19th
 2017 – Did not qualify
 2019 – Did not qualify
 2021 – "Did not qualify"

Asian Championship
 1997 – 5th
 1999 –  Bronze medal
 2001 – 4th
 2003 – 4th
 2005 –  Bronze medal
 2007 – 4th 	
 2008 – 5th 	
 2010 – 5th
 2012 –  Bronze medal
 2014 – 5th
 2017 – 5th
 2018 – 5th
 2020 – Cancelled

External links
Official website

volleyball
Women's volleyball in Taiwan
National women's under-18 volleyball teams